The Kerama deer (also Kerama Sika) is a endangered subspecies of the Sika deer native to the Kerama Islands.

History
Kerama deer were imported from the Kagoshima Prefecture in the early 17th century. They were heavily hunted because they destroyed crops, causing the population to rapidly decline, and are now a government-protected species. The total known population was 130 as of 1995. They have been designated a Natural Monument of Japan.

Description
Kerama deer have dark brown hair. Only the bucks have antlers, which are shed from March to April. They are small, weighing only about 75 kilograms.

References

Fauna of Japan
Cervus
Subspecies